Ashland station is an at-grade rapid transit station on the PATCO Speedline, operated by the Delaware River Port Authority. It is located in Voorhees Township, New Jersey near the intersection of Evesham and Burnt Mill Roads.

Station layout 
Ashland is a two-level station. The platform is at-grade, while the station house is located below grade. An elevator between the platform and the station house was added in 2020, making the station accessible to people with disabilities.

References

External links 
Ashland (PATCO)

PATCO Speedline stations in New Jersey
Railway stations in the United States opened in 1969
Voorhees Township, New Jersey
1969 establishments in New Jersey